The Tittoni government of Italy held office from 12 March until 28 March 1905, a total of 16 days. It is the shortest ever government in the history of Italy.

Government parties
The government was composed by the following parties:

Composition

References

Italian governments
1905 establishments in Italy